In mathematics, the Chan–Karolyi–Longstaff–Sanders process (abbreviated as CKLS process) is a stochastic process with applications to finance. In particular it has been used to model the term structure of interest rates. The CKLS process can also be viewed as a generalization of the Ornstein–Uhlenbeck process. It is named after K. C. Chan, G. Andrew Karolyi, Francis A. Longstaff, and Anthony B. Sanders. They invented the model in a paper published in 1992.

Definition 
The CKLS process  is defined by the following stochastic differential equation:

where  denotes the Wiener process. The CKLS process has the following equivalent definition:

Properties 

 CKLS is an example of a mean-reverting process
Moreover, the MGF can be written as the MGF of the CIR model plus a term that is a solution to a Nonlinear partial differential equation.
 The CKLS equation has a unique pathwise solution.
 Cai and Wang (2015) have derived a central limit theorem and deviation principle for the CKLS model while studying its asymptotic behavior.
 CKLS has been referred to as a time-homogeneous model as usually the parameters  are taken to be time-independent.
 The CKLS has also been referred to as a one-factor model (also see Factor analysis).

Special cases 
Many interest rate models and short-rate models are special cases of the CKLS process, including:

 Merton model
 Vasicek model
 CIR SR: square root (SR) process appears in the Cox–Ingersoll–Ross model (CIR), obtained by setting 
 Dothan
 Geometric Brownian motion and Black–Merton–Scholes model
 Brennan-Schwarz model
 CIR VR
 Constant elasticity of variance model (CEV)

These can be obtained by setting the CKLS model parameters to special values.

Financial applications 
The CKLS process is often used to model interest rate dynamics and pricing of bonds, bond options, currency exchange rates, securities, and other options, derivatives, and contingent claims. It has also been used in the pricing of fixed income and credit risk and has been combined with other time series methods such as GARCH-class models.

One question studied in the literature is how to set the model parameters, in particular the elasticity parameter . Robust statistics and nonparametric estimation techniques have been used to measure CKLS model parameters.

In their original paper, CKLS argued that the elasticity of interest rate volatility is 1.5 based on historical data, a result that has been widely cited.

Later empirical studies by Bliss and Smith have shown the reverse: sometimes lower  values (like 0.5) in the CKLS model can capture volatility dependence more accurately compared to higher  values. Moreover, by redefining the regime period, Bliss and Smith have shown that there is evidence for regime shift in the Federal Reserve between 1979 and 1982.

The period of 1979-1982 marked a change in monetary policy of the Federal Reserve, and this regime change has often been studied in the context of CKLS models.

References 

Stochastic differential equations
Markov processes
Variants of random walks
Financial models
Financial risk modeling
Credit risk
Options (finance)
Derivatives (finance)
Equity securities
Interest rates
Fixed income analysis
Stochastic models
Short-rate models